Douglas Ganton is an American sound engineer. He was nominated for an Academy Award in the category Best Sound. for the film Legends of the Fall. He worked on 75 films from 1975 to 2009.

Selected filmography
 Legends of the Fall (1994)

References

External links

Year of birth missing (living people)
Living people
American audio engineers